Takoma is a Washington Metro station on the Red Line in the Takoma neighborhood of Washington, D.C., bordering Takoma Park, Maryland. The station is considered to be located in part of Takoma Park's Historic District. It is the last station in the District of Columbia on the eastern end of the Red Line heading to Maryland, located east of the intersection of Blair Road NW and Cedar Street NW. The station's parking lot and bus stops are accessed from Eastern Avenue NW, which runs along the DC–Maryland line.

History
Prior to the opening of Metrorail, the Baltimore and Ohio Railroad (B&O) operated commuter trains that served intra-DC locations, including Takoma Park (this service continues as MARC's Brunswick Line, although the closest station serving the area is in Silver Spring, Maryland).  Commuter rail service ended before Metrorail service began, and the old shelter for the rail stop was demolished in order to widen the right-of-way to accommodate Metrorail. Remnants of the Takoma Park B&O rail stop are visible to the west of the Metro station.  The original Takoma Park railroad station, located within DC, burned down in 1962.

Construction of the Metrorail Station took place in the early 1970s, and the station shares architectural features with the other above-ground stations constructed across the system. Takoma was among some of the first stations to open in the Metrorail System, less than two years after the system's inauguration on March 27, 1976. Service to Takoma began on February 6, 1978.

In 2017, the station was closed from November 25 to December 10 as part of Metro's Capital Improvement Program. The work mainly focused on replacing and repairing existing tracks.

2009 collision

On June 22, 2009, a southbound Metro train on the Red Line collided with another southbound train, which was stopped between the Takoma and Fort Totten stations, causing the deadliest accident in the system's history.

Station layout
The entrance to the station is at the street level, with escalators leading up to the platform.  A separate accessible entrance consisting of a single elevator is located near the middle of the platform. The separate accessible and general entrances are a relative rarity in the Washington Metro system; only  and  stations share this feature. 

There are two tracks to either side of the island platform, with Metro trains use the inner tracks and Amtrak and MARC Trains using the outer tracks.

References

External links
 

 The Schumin Web Transit Center: Takoma Station

1978 establishments in Maryland
Buildings and structures in Takoma Park, Maryland
Stations on the Red Line (Washington Metro)
Railway stations in Montgomery County, Maryland
Railway stations in the United States opened in 1978
Takoma (Washington, D.C.)
Washington Metro stations in Washington, D.C.
Former Baltimore and Ohio Railroad stations